"Namida no Saki ni" is Crystal Kay's 22nd single, it was released on June 11, 2008. It is Kay's first single in over a year, since the release of the single "Anata no Soba de" in May 2007. The title track was used as the commercial song for Tully's Coffee commercials throughout June. The song exhibited a new, rockier sound for the singer.

Track listing

Charts

External links 
 

2008 singles
Crystal Kay songs
2008 songs
Epic Records singles